"Rest in Peace" is the twenty-fourth and final episode of the eleventh season of the post-apocalyptic horror television series The Walking Dead. The series finale and 177th episode overall, it aired on AMC on November 20, 2022, and was simultaneously released on the streaming platform AMC+. The episode's teleplay was written by Corey Reed and Jim Barnes, from a story by Angela Kang, and directed by Greg Nicotero.

In the episode, the group escapes the horde that has invaded the Commonwealth while trying to overthrow Governor Pamela Milton (Laila Robins), and assembling for one last stand to save the city and their future.

"Rest in Peace" features the return of Rick Grimes, portrayed by Andrew Lincoln, and Michonne, portrayed by Danai Gurira, since they left the series in season 9 and 10, respectively. The episode also includes flashbacks of many different characters featured throughout the series.

The episode received generally positive reviews from critics. Reviews highlighted the end of plot threads, character development, and the return of Rick and Michonne, while some felt the setting-up of future spin-off shows detracted from the finality of the series.

Plot
Jules is devoured trying to escape from the horde, while Luke is fatally bitten in the leg. In a safehouse, Judith is treated by Tomi, and reveals to Daryl and Carol that Michonne had left in search of a still-alive Rick. After amputating his leg, Magna, Connie, Yumiko and Kelly emotionally gather around Luke as he dies. Meanwhile, Rosita, Gabriel and Eugene successfully rescue Coco and the other children from a house. As they are escaping, Rosita is bitten on the left shoulder while the group runs from the horde.

Princess and Max break Mercer out of prison. Mercer subsequently leads his men and the Coalition forces in confronting Pamela as she barricades herself in the Estates. As Maggie prepares to take arms against Pamela, Negan sincerely apologizes to her for killing her husband Glenn. With the people outside about to be devoured, Daryl delivers a rousing speech that causes Pamela's soldiers to turn on her and allow everyone inside. Mercer arrests Pamela for her crimes, but she tries to feed herself to a zombified Lance Hornsby instead. Recognizing that prison is a worse fate for Pamela, Maggie shoots Hornsby and saves her. United and joined by Aaron, Lydia, Jerry and Elijah, everyone lures the horde into the Estates and blows it up, destroying the horde and saving the Commonwealth.

In the aftermath, Maggie tells Negan that she is unable to forgive him, but decides to try moving past her anger. The survivors enjoy a lavish dinner together while Rosita tells Gabriel that she was bitten. Rosita later peacefully succumbs to her bite surrounded by Gabriel and Eugene.

A year later, Ezekiel is the new governor and Mercer is the new lieutenant governor of the Commonwealth. Alexandria and the Hilltop have been rebuilt and are thriving, with the communities remaining united in creating a better future. Eugene and Max have a child, Rosie, together while Negan sends a letter with the compass that Judith allowed him to keep back to her. Lastly, Carol, Daryl and Maggie talk about the future, with Daryl leaving on his motorcycle to find Rick and Michonne.

Elsewhere, Rick and Michonne write letters around their own campfires while flashbacks to moments in the series appear. Michonne continues her search for Rick on horseback. On Bloodsworth Island, where Michonne would eventually find his belongings, Rick is located by a CRM helicopter and forced to surrender. The episode concludes with Judith and R.J. looking ahead to the future, with the former saying: "We get to start over. We're the ones who live."

Production

The opening musical score differs from previous episodes because original composer Bear McCreary returned to re-record a new version with a live orchestra. Norman Reedus suffered a concussion on set while filming the episode after hitting his head, although the black-eye his character receives was already in the script prior to this happening. Chandler Riggs, whose character, Carl Grimes, was killed off in season 8, surprised the cast and crew on the last day of filming and can be seen in the background as a farmer toward the final scene at Hilltop. The opening scene in the hospital was noted for its many visual connections to previous seasons: a walker uses a rock to break a glass door ("Guts"), Judith is protected in her hospital room by a stretcher (her father is saved in a similar way in "TS-19"), and the Coalition gathers for a dinner as a family (a dream sequence seen in "The Day Will Come When You Won't Be").

Production on the episode wrapped in April except for the scene featuring Rick and Michonne, which was filmed in August. The scene was written by Scott M. Gimple, who is the showrunner on their upcoming spin-off show, and was shot over two days in Georgia. The final moments of the episode features a montage of scenes from every prior season of the series that includes past cast members while a voice-over orbits around a single line: "We're the ones who live." While many of the voices uttering this mantra are spoken by characters already in season 11, such as Daryl and Maggie, several former actors recorded lines for the montage also. This includes the voices of former Walking Dead actors Michael Cudlitz (Abraham), Laurie Holden (Andrea), Lennie James (Morgan), Sonequa Martin-Green (Sasha), Chandler Riggs (Carl), and Steven Yeun (Glenn).

On its original airing, advertisements for Autodesk, Deloitte, DoorDash, Maximum Effort, and Ring were specifically designed to accompany the episode. The ads, jointly produced by AMC and Ryan Reynolds' production company Maximum Effort, featured zombified versions of Walking Dead characters including Milton Mamet (Dallas Roberts), Andrea (Laurie Holden), Rodney (Joe Ando-Hirsh), and Gareth (Andrew J. West).

Eleanor Matsuura's baby bump is visible during her last scene as Yumiko following the one year time jump. Matsuura alluded that given the Commonwealth's healthcare and her brother, Yumiko may have received in vitro fertilization to have a baby with Magna (Nadia Hilker). In Norman Reedus' closing scene, episode director and special make-up effects artist Greg Nicotero makes a cameo as a walker stumbling along the road dressed in a striped shirt; Nicotero has portrayed a walker numerous times throughout the series.

Reception

Critical reception
The episode received generally positive reviews from critics.

Ratings
The episode achieved a viewership of 2.27 million views in the United States on its original air date. It marked the highest viewership of the season and was the highest-rated episode since "Home Sweet Home" on February 28, 2021.

References

External links
 "Rest in Peace" at AMC
 

2022 American television episodes
American television series finales
The Walking Dead (TV series) episodes